The 1971–72 Florida State Seminoles men's basketball team represented Florida State University during the 1971–72 college basketball season. Led by head coach Hugh Durham, the Seminoles reached the Championship Game of the NCAA tournament before losing to unbeaten, 5-time defending champion UCLA, 81–76. The team finished with an overall record of 28–5.

Roster

Schedule and results

|-
!colspan=9 style=| Regular season
|-

|-
!colspan=9 style=| NCAA Tournament
|-

Rankings

NBA Draft

References

Florida State Seminoles men's basketball seasons
Florida State
Florida State
NCAA Division I men's basketball tournament Final Four seasons
1971 in sports in Florida
1972 in sports in Florida